Homert is a German placename and may refer to the following places or geographical features in the state of North Rhine-Westphalia:

Place
 Homert (Lüdenscheid), a village named after the peak in the Ebbe Mountains in the municipality of Lüdenscheid in

Mountains and hills (sorted by height)
 Homert (Lenne Mountains) (656.1 m), near Eslohe-Obersalwey in the Lenne Mountains, Homert Nature Park, county of Hochsauerlandkreis
 Homert (Ebbe Mountains) (538.3 m), near Lüdenscheid-Homert in the  Ebbe Mountains, Ebbegebirge Nature Park, county of Märkischer Kreis
 Homert (Olpe) (536.7 m), near Olpe-Oberneger in the Ebbegebirge Nature Park, county of Olpe
 Homert (Oberbergischer Kreis) (519.2 m), near Gummersbach-Oberrengse in the Bergisches Land Nature Park, county of Oberbergischer Kreis
 Homert (Altenaffeln) (511.2 m), near Neuenrade-Altenaffeln in the Lenne Mountains, Homert Nature Park, county of Märkischer Kreis
 Nature parks
 Homert Nature Park, in the counties of Märkischer Kreis, Hochsauerlandkreis and Olpe